Pouya Norouzinejad Gharehlou (born 23 June 1994) is an Iranian handball player who plays for Frisch Auf Göppingen and the Iranian national team.

References

1994 births
Living people
Iranian male handball players
Handball players at the 2014 Asian Games
Asian Games competitors for Iran
People from Ardabil
21st-century Iranian people